"Gentlemen Take Polaroids" is a song by English new wave band Japan, released as a single from the album of the same name in October 1980. It was the band's first charting single in the UK, peaking at number 60.

Reception 
The single was the band's first release under Virgin Records and "established a clever music bridge between the refined groove of Quiet Life and the band's forthcoming LP". The song was popular with club DJs: Nick Rhodes regularly played it at the Rum Runner, and Rusty Egan played it at the Blitz.

It has been described as a "dynamic masterpiece alternating between the experimental, free-floating middle parts, and the casual pop chorus found throughout the song". However, reviewing the song for Record Mirror, Ronnie Gurr described the single as having an "awful title and mellifluously nondescript Roxy rip-off A-side. Elsewhere Eno's school of modern bland-out muzak that's so dull and nondescript, one can't ignore the fact the damn stuff takes hold".

Track listings 
7-inch: Virgin / VS 379 (UK)

 "Gentlemen Take Polaroids" – 3:28
 "The Experience of Swimming" – 4:04

7-inch: Virgin / 102 513 (Germany)

 "Gentlemen Take Polaroids" – 3:28
 "The Width of a Room" – 3:14

7-inch: Virgin / VIPX-1550 (Japan)

 "Gentlemen Take Polaroids" – 3:28
 "Burning Bridges" – 3:59

Double 7-inch EP: Virgin / VS 379 (UK)

 "Gentlemen Take Polaroids" – 3:28
 "The Experience of Swimming" – 4:04
 "The Width of a Room" – 3:12
 "Burning Bridges" – 3:59

Mini CD EP: Virgin / CDT 32 (UK, 1988)

 "Gentlemen Take Polaroids" – 7:05
 "Cantonese Boy" – 3:44
 "Methods of Dance" – 6:53

Personnel 
Japan

 David Sylvian – vocals
 Richard Barbieri – synthesizers
 Mick Karn – fretless bass, saxophone, oboe
 Rob Dean – guitar
 Steve Jansen – drums

Technical

 Nigel Walker – engineer
 Steve Prestage – engineer
 Nicola Tyson – photography
 Steve Chivers – assisted photography

Charts

References 

1980 songs
1980 singles
Songs written by David Sylvian
Japan (band) songs
Virgin Records singles